Typhis hebetatus is an extinct species of sea snail, a marine gastropod mollusk, in the family Muricidae, the murex snails or rock snails. It was 25–35 mm long, and is visually similar to Typhis adventus, though is more slender and has two variceal spines.

Distribution
This species occurs in New Zealand.

References

hebetatus
Gastropods described in 1877